Maurits Frank (29 July 1892 in Rotterdam – 3 March 1959 in Cologne) was a Dutch cellist and music educator.

The student of Pablo Casals taught in Heidelberg and Neustadt/Palatinate before he moved to the Hoch Conservatory in Frankfurt in 1915.  During this time, he was the musical partner of Paul Hindemith in the Rebner Quartet and the Amar Quartet.

After the seizure of power by the Nazis, he had to leave Germany for racist reasons and went to the Netherlands. In 1949 he returned to Germany and taught cello and chamber music at the Hochschule für Musik und Tanz Köln. He continued to work as a chamber musician and devoted himself especially to contemporary music. Thus he played the world premiere of Hindemith's Cello Concerto in E flat and with Eduard Zuckmayer the world premiere of Anton Webern's Two Little Pieces. In 1957 he founded the Rheinisches Kammerorchester Köln. Under the title Tonleitern und Dreiklänge he published studies and exercises for the cello.

Since 1916 Frank was married to Luisa Juncker. He died at the age of 66 years in his apartment in Bayenthal.

Further reading 
 Werner Röder; Herbert A. Strauss, (ed.), Biographisches Handbuch der deutschsprachigen Emigration nach 1933 / International Biographical Dictionary of Central European Emigrés 1933–1945, Vol II, 1 Munich : Saur 1983 ,

References

External links 
 
 Maurits Frank on Webarchiv
 Frank, Maurits im Lexikon verfolgte Musikerinnen und Musiker der NS-Zeit der Universität Hamburg

1892 births
1959 deaths
Musicians from Rotterdam
Dutch classical cellists
Dutch music educators
Emigrants from Nazi Germany to the Netherlands
Academic staff of the Hochschule für Musik und Tanz Köln
20th-century classical musicians
20th-century cellists